En vida is the first live album by Argentine band Almafuerte recorded and released in 1997.

Track listing
 De los pagos del tiempo
 El pibe tigre
 Lanzando al mundo
 Atravesando todo límite (Cover of Hermética)
 Desencuentro
 1999
 Buitres
 Por nacer
 Sentir indiano
 Mal bicho
 De mandadores y mandados
 Gil trabajador (Cover of Hermética)
 Moraleja (Cover of Hermética)
 Ayer deseo, hoy realidad (Cover of Hermética)
 Zamba de resurrección
 Dijo el droguero al drogador
 Por tu suerte
 Del más allá

Personnel
Ricardo Iorio – vocals, bass
Claudio Marciello – guitars
Walter Martinez – drums

1997 live albums
Almafuerte (band) live albums
Spanish-language live albums
PolyGram live albums